Winnetonka is a neighborhood of Kansas City, Missouri, United States.

The community's name is partially derived from Winn, the surname of the original owner of the site.

See also
Winnetonka High School

References

Neighborhoods in Kansas City, Missouri